File spanning is the ability to package a single file or data stream into separate files of a specified size.  This task implies the ability to re-combine the package files back into the original file or data stream.

This is useful when saving large files onto smaller volumes or breaking large files up into smaller files for network messages of limited size (email, newsgroups).  It also allows the creation of parity files such as parchive (PAR) to verify and restore missing or corrupted package files.  Another advantage with this is coping with file size limits on some file systems of removable media, or coping with volume size limits of things like floppy disks.

Sometimes the file spanning process is hidden as a secondary operation such as with file archivers.  In this case, many smaller files are first packaged into a data stream and then repackaged into a multi-file archive.

File spanning software
Many file spanning utilities are available for nearly every OS and platform. Below are a few examples:
 PKZip/WinZip 
 RAR/WinRAR
 PAR/Parchive
 split (Unix)

See also
 File splitter

Storage software